Bloyer Field  is a city owned public use airport located one nautical mile (2 km) east of the central business district of Tomah, a city in Monroe County, Wisconsin, United States. It provides general aviation service.

History 
First known as Tomah Army Airfield Technical School, it was activated on November 30, 1942 to conduct technical training for United States Army Air Forces. 1000 Technical School Squadron (Special) provided technical training included radio interception techniques, radio maintenance and operations to personnel.  It functioned as a sub-base of Radio school at Truax Army Airfield at Madison, itself part of Central (later Eastern) Technical Training Command. The school was inactivated on April 1, 1944. The facility was transferred to Air Technical Service Command on April 30, 1944. It was transferred as inactive to the US Army Corps of Engineers on April 1, 1946 for disposition.

The airfield was turned over to civil control though the War Assets Administration (WAA).

Facilities and aircraft 
Bloyer Field covers an area of 160 acres (65 ha) at an elevation of 966 feet (294 m) above mean sea level. It has one runway designated 7/25 with an asphalt surface measuring 3,900 by 75 feet (1,189 x 23 m).

For the 12-month period ending June 22, 2022, the airport had 3,575 aircraft operations, an average of 10 per day: 98% general aviation, 1% military and less than 1% air taxi.

In January 2023, there were 7 aircraft based at this airport: 5 single-engine, 1 multi-engine and 1 ultralight.

See also 

 List of airports in Wisconsin
 Wisconsin World War II Army Airfields

References 

 
 Manning, Thomas A. (2005), History of Air Education and Training Command, 1942–2002.  Office of History and Research, Headquarters, AETC, Randolph AFB, Texas 
 Shaw, Frederick J. (2004), Locating Air Force Base Sites, History’s Legacy, Air Force History and Museums Program, United States Air Force, Washington DC.

External links 

Airports in Wisconsin
Buildings and structures in Monroe County, Wisconsin
1942 establishments in Wisconsin
Airfields of the United States Army Air Forces in Wisconsin
Airports established in 1942